Jalisco is a state in Western Mexico that is divided into 125 municipalities. According to the 2020 Mexican Census, it is the third most populated state with  inhabitants and the seventh largest by land area spanning . The largest municipality by population is Zapopan, with 1,476,491 residents (17.68% of the state's total), while the smallest is Santa María del Oro with 1,815 residents. The newest is San Ignacio Cerro Gordo, established in 2007 out of Arandas.

Municipalities in Jalisco are administratively autonomous of the state according to the 115th article of the 1917 Constitution of Mexico. Their legal framework derives from the state Constitution. Every three years, citizens elect a municipal president (Spanish: presidente municipal) by a plurality voting system who heads a concurrently elected municipal council (ayuntamiento) responsible for providing all the public services for their constituents. The municipal council consists of a variable number of trustees and councillors (regidores y síndicos). Municipalities are responsible for public services (such as water and sewerage), street lighting, public safety, traffic, and the maintenance of public parks, gardens and cemeteries. They may also assist the state and federal governments in education, emergency fire and medical services, environmental protection and maintenance of monuments and historical landmarks. Since 1984, they have had the power to collect property taxes and user fees, although more funds are obtained from the state and federal governments than from their own income.

Municipalities

Notes

References 

 
Jalisco